Portugal competed at the 2000 Summer Paralympics in Sydney, Australia. 52 competitors from Portugal won 15 medals including 6 gold, 5 silver and 4 bronze to finish 26th in the medal table.

Medal table

See also 
 Portugal at the Paralympics
 Portugal at the 2000 Summer Olympics

References 

Nations at the 2000 Summer Paralympics
2000
2000 in Portuguese sport